Patania silicalis, the herbivorous pleuroptya moth, is a moth in the subfamily Spilomelinae of the family Crambidae. It was described by Achille Guenée in 1854. It is found in Brazil, Venezuela, Ecuador, French Guiana, Guyana, Guatemala, Costa Rica, Panama, Mexico, Cuba, Jamaica, Puerto Rico, Hispaniola and North America, where it has been recorded from Missouri, Michigan, Ohio and New York, south to Florida.

The forewings range from yellowish gray to orangish with dark gray antemedial and postmedial lines, as well as a discal spot in a dark gray crescent. The hindwings have a similar color and have similar markings, but lack an antemedial line. Adults are on wing in summer in North America.

The larvae feed on Polygonum, Ipomoea batatas, Ipomoea setifera, Merremia umbellata, Rivina humilis, Bougainvillea spectabilis and Boehmeria nivea.

References

Moths described in 1854
Moths of Central America
Moths of North America
Moths of South America
Moths of the Caribbean
Spilomelinae
Taxa named by Achille Guenée